Assyrians in Russia number 14,000 according to the 2002 Russian census.

History 
Assyrians came to Russia and the Soviet Union in three main waves: 
The first wave was after the Treaty of Turkmenchay in 1828, that delineated a border between Russia and Persia. Many Assyrians found themselves suddenly under Russian sovereignty and thousands of relatives crossed the border to join them. 
The second wave was a result of the repression and violence during and after World War I. 
The third wave came after World War II, when Moscow unsuccessfully tried to establish a satellite state in Iranian Kurdistan. Soviet troops withdrew in 1946, and left the Assyrians exposed to exactly the same kind of retaliation that they had suffered from the Turks 30 years earlier. Again, many Assyrians found refuge in the Soviet Union, this time mainly in the cities. From 1937 to 1959, the Assyrian population in USSR grew by 587.3%. The Soviets in the thirties oppressed the Assyrians' religion and persecuted religious and other leaders.

In recent years, the Assyrians have tended to assimilate, but their cultural and ethnic identity, strengthened through centuries of hardships, found new expression under Glasnost.

Current situation 
According to the 2002 Russian census there were 14,000 Assyrians in Russia. 13,300 people (95% of all Assyrians) spoke Syriac as native language.

References

Ethnic groups in Russia
Russia
Assyrian ethnic groups